Craspeditidae is an ammonoid cephalopod family included in the Perisphinctoidea superfamily. Some classifiers consider the Craspeditidae a subfamily in the Polyptychitidae.

These ammonites lived during the Late Jurassic and Early Cretaceous.

Genera
Craspedites †
Platylenticeras †
Tolypeceras †

References

Cretaceous ammonites
Jurassic ammonites
Perisphinctoidea
Ammonitida families